The Jeanneau Yachts 55 is a French blue water cruising sailboat, first built in 2023. The hull was designed by Philippe Briand, the interior by Andrew Winch and finishing by the Jeanneau Design Office.

The boat was introduced at the 2023 Dusseldorf boat show.

Production
The design has been built by Jeanneau in France, since 2023 and remains in production.

Design
The Jeanneau Yachts 55 is a recreational keelboat, built predominantly of vacuum-infused fiberglass, with wood trim. It has a fractional sloop rig with a bowsprit, an over-plumb stem, a reverse transom with a drop-down tailgate swimming platform, dual internally mounted spade-type rudders controlled by dual wheels located forward in the cockpit and a fixed "L"-shaped fin keel with a weighted bulb or optional shoal-draft keel. The mainsheet is located on a fiberglass cockpit arch. The fin keel model displaces  and carries  of cast iron ballast, while the shoal draft version carries  of ballast.

A rigid bimini top is a factory option.

The design has a unique three cabin interior layout available, with sleeping accommodation for six people. It has a double island berth in the forward cabin, an "L"-shaped settee and two seats in the salon and two aft cabins, each with a double berth. A small crew cabin can also be fitted in the bow. The aft cabins have their own steps to the cockpit and are not connected to the main salon. The galley is located on the starboard side just forward of the companionway ladder. The galley is of a straight configuration, with an island and is equipped with a stove, an ice box and a double sink. There are three heads, one in each cabin.

Operational history
The boat is supported by an active class club the Jeanneau Owners Network.

In a 2023 review for Yachting News, Silvia Pretto wrote, "the lines are modern, fresh and captivating, and the deck plan has been completely revolutionized: an advanced and truly impressive dual cockpit, a huge relaxation area aft with two sofas, one U-shaped and one L-shaped, that turn into large sunbathing areas. The stern opens electrically to reveal a large interior compartment from which the bathing platform also originates, providing easy access to the sea for guests on board."

See also
List of sailing boat types

References

External links

Keelboats
2020s sailboat type designs
Sailing yachts
Sailboat type designs by Philippe Briand
Sailboat type designs by Andrew Winch
Sailboat type designs by Jeanneau Design Office
Sailboat types built by Jeanneau